The 1929 Delaware Fightin' Blue Hens football team represented the University of Delaware in the 1929 NCAA football season. The Fightin' Blue Hens were led by first year head coach Gus Ziegler and played their home games at Frazer Field. They were classified as Independent since they did not have a conference affiliation. The 1929 season was the third winless season in school history after they finished the year 0–7–1.

Schedule

References

Delaware
Delaware Fightin' Blue Hens football seasons
College football winless seasons
Delaware Football